Mavelikara S. R. Raju is an acclaimed Carnatic music percussionist. He is adept in playing the mridangam. He is the sishya (disciple) of the celebrated Mridangam maestro Mavelikara Krishnankutty Nair.

His father M.N. Raghavan Pillai, was a mridangam player who played for harikathas and dramas. So right from childhood, he has had a fascination for the mridangam. In 1958 he joined All India radio as a mridangam artiste. In 1999 Kerala Sangeetha Nadaka Academy granted its fellowship to him. He has accompanied all most all the maestros of last 50– 60 years. He has visited and played in several concerts in Pittisburg, USA and was Asthanvidwan of the Sree Venkateswara Temple Pittsburg. He was blessed with a peculiar playing style with beautiful "sarwalaghus" and heavy "koruvais", thus covering the entire length, breadth and depth of a "laya vadyam" performance. He received the Kerala Sangeetha Nataka Akademi Award in 1985 and the Kerala Sangeetha Nataka Akademi Fellowship in 1999.

References

External links
  The Hindu
The New Indian Express
 www.keralasangeethanatakaakademi.com

Mridangam players
Musicians from Alappuzha
Living people
Year of birth missing (living people)
Recipients of the Kerala Sangeetha Nataka Akademi Fellowship
Recipients of the Kerala Sangeetha Nataka Akademi Award